Traskwood is a city in Saline County, Arkansas, United States. The population was 518 at the 2010 census. It is part of the Little Rock–North Little Rock–Conway Metropolitan Statistical Area.

Geography 

Traskwood is located at  (34.455474, -92.659288).

According to the United States Census Bureau, the town has a total area of 14.7 km (5.7 mi2), of which 14.6 km (5.7 mi2) is land and 0.18% is water.

Demographics

2020 census

As of the 2020 United States census, there were 495 people, 147 households, and 94 families residing in the city.

2000 census
As of the census of 2000, there were 548 people, 203 households, and 149 families residing in the town.  The population density was 37.4/km (97.1/mi2).  There were 211 housing units at an average density of 14.4/km (37.4/mi2).  The racial makeup of the town was 97.26% White, 0.73% Black or African American, 0.18% Native American, 0.73% from other races, and 1.09% from two or more races.  1.28% of the population were Hispanic or Latino of any race.

There were 203 households, out of which 34.0% had children under the age of 18 living with them, 59.1% were married couples living together, 9.9% had a female householder with no husband present, and 26.6% were non-families. 23.6% of all households were made up of individuals, and 6.9% had someone living alone who was 65 years of age or older.  The average household size was 2.70 and the average family size was 3.18.

In the town the population was spread out, with 29.6% under the age of 18, 8.9% from 18 to 24, 27.2% from 25 to 44, 24.5% from 45 to 64, and 9.9% who were 65 years of age or older.  The median age was 35 years. For every 100 females, there were 97.8 males.  For every 100 females age 18 and over, there were 95.9 males.

The median income for a household in the town was $33,929, and the median income for a family was $40,500. Males had a median income of $27,750 versus $21,042 for females. The per capita income for the town was $13,555.  About 12.8% of families and 18.5% of the population were below the poverty line, including 28.7% of those under age 18 and 5.5% of those age 65 or over.

Education
It is in the Glen Rose School District.

References 

Cities in Saline County, Arkansas
Cities in Arkansas
Cities in Little Rock–North Little Rock–Conway metropolitan area